Alex Delicata is an American songwriter, producer, and multi-instrumentalist, best known for co-writing Kygo & OneRepublic's "Lose Somebody", Rihanna's "California King Bed", Beyoncé's "Daddy Lessons" and Meek Mill's "All Eyes on You". A frequent collaborator of production teams The Monarch and The Runners, many of Delicata's documented musical contributions have begun with informal, impromptu guitar sessions to formulate potential melodies and lyrical themes. He has also worked with Rita Ora, MGK, Hunter Hayes, and Lil Wayne, among others.

Songwriting, instrumental and production credits
Credits are courtesy of Discogs, Tidal, Spotify, and AllMusic.

Awards and nominations

References 

American hip hop record producers

Living people

Year of birth missing (living people)